Radio America may refer to

 Radio America (United States)
 Radio America (Honduras)
 Radio America (band)
 Radio America (film), a 2015 American film by Christopher Showerman